Theophilus Riemer (6 February 1876 – 30 August 1958) was a South African cricketer. He played in three first-class matches for Border in 1897/98.

See also
 List of Border representative cricketers

References

External links
 

1876 births
1958 deaths
South African cricketers
Border cricketers
Sportspeople from Qonce